The Phragmoplastophyta (Lecointre & Guyader 2006) are a proposed sister clade of the Klebsormidiaceae in the Streptophyte/Charophyte clade. The Phragmoplastophyta consist of the Charophycaea and another unnamed clade which contains the Coleochaetophyceae, Zygnematophyceae, Mesotaeniaceae, and Embryophytes (land plants). It is an important step in the emergence of land plants within the green algae. It is equivalent to the ZCC clade/grade, cladistically granting the Embryophyta.

The mitosis of Phragmoplastophyta takes place via a phragmoplast.

Another synapomorphy of this clade is the synthesis of cellulose microfibrils by a complex of octameric cellulose synthetases. This complex crosses the plasma membrane and polymerizes molecules from the cytoplasm into cellulose microfibrils, which, together with each other, form fibrils, necessary in the formation of the wall. The Phragmoplastophyte wall is also formed of phenolic compounds.

Below is a consensus reconstruction of green algal relationships, mainly based on molecular data.

References

Green algae